Northwest Fork Hundred is a hundred in Sussex County, Delaware, United States. Northwest Fork Hundred was formed in 1775 from Dorchester County, Maryland. Its primary community is Bridgeville.

References

Hundreds in Sussex County, Delaware
1775 establishments in Delaware